Planica 1940 was a ski flying study week, allowed only in study purposes, with main competition held on 10 March 1940 in Planica, Drava Banovina, Kingdom of Yugoslavia. Over 6,000 people has gathered.

Schedule

Competition
On 6 March 1940, training was on schedule, but canceled due to strong wind. Albin Novšak was first and the only one who jumped that day, landing at 75 metres.

On 7 March 1940, training was on schedule, but canceled due to strong wind. Albin Jakopič was first only one who jumped that day, landing at 65 metres.

On 8 March 1940, first official training was on schedule at last, after two days of waiting due to strong wind. Josef Bradl set the distance of the day at 88 metres.

On 9 March 1940, second official training was on schedule. Total of 46 jumps and three times over one hundred metres. Josef Bradl set the distance of the day at 101.5 metres.

On 10 March 1940, the ski flying study competition in front of 6,000 people was on schedule. Among the 13 competitors on start, Gregor Höll won in Planica for the first and only time.

Official training 1
8 March 1940 – 12:30 PM – Four rounds

Official training 2
9 March 1940 – Four rounds 

 Fall or touch!

Official results

Ski Flying Study competition
10 March 1940 – 12:00 PM – Five rounds – ranking incomplete – points were not available to media

References

Planica
Planica
Planica
Planica
Ski jumping competitions in Yugoslavia
International sports competitions hosted by Yugoslavia
Ski jumping competitions in Slovenia
International sports competitions hosted by Slovenia